Mary Lewis Harper Milne known as Mrs. Leslie Milne (1860–1932) was an English anthropologist who traveled extensively and wrote about the ethnic peoples of the Shan State in Northern Burma. Her best known book, The Shans at Home, was an account of the cultural practices and day-to-day life of the Shan people of the village of Namkham in Shan State and was based on the many months she spent living in that village. She was also the author of The Home of an Eastern Clan, a book about the life and culture of the Palaung people, and wrote the first, and what is possibly the only English-Palaung dictionary. Writing about The Shans at Home and her book on Palaung grammar, The New York Times commented "it would be hard to find a more complete and yet readable account of the habits, customs, and religious ideas of a tribe or small nation than the ones she has given of the Palaungs" and called The Home of an Eastern Clan a "mine of information" for 
ethnologists.

Published works 
 The Shans at Home, London, John Murray (1910).
 An Elementary Palaung Grammar, Oxford, Clarendon Press (1921). Published in 1921, this was the first survey of the grammar of the Palaung language, the language of a hill tribe of the Shan State of Burma and of the Yunnan province of China. Mrs. Milne traveled to Namshan, the capital of the Palaung state of Tawngpeng, to the Palaungs of North Hsenwi, as well as to the Palaungs of Yunnan to collect material for this book.
 The Home of an Eastern Clan: A Study of the Palaungs of the Shan State, Oxford, Clarendon Press (1924).
 A Dictionary of English-Palaung and Palaung-English, Rangoon (1931).

Family 
Mary Milne is the daughter of Carter Milne and the paternal-granddaughter of William Milne.

Notes

References 
 Shorto, H. L. (1973). Three Mon-Khmer Word Families. Bulletin of the School of Oriental and African Studies, Vol 36 No. 2, pp. 374–81.
 Grierson, George A. (1922). An Elementary Palaung Grammar: Book Review. Bulletin of the School of Oriental and African Studies, Vol 2 No. 2, pp. 339–40.
 Hodson, T. C. (1912). The Shans at Home: Book Review. The Journal of the Royal Anthropological Institute of Great Britain and Ireland, Vol 12, pp. 27–29.

External links
 

History of Myanmar
1860 births
1932 deaths
British women anthropologists
British anthropologists
20th-century anthropologists
Cultural anthropologists